ARF GTPase-activating protein GIT2 is an enzyme that in humans is encoded by the GIT2 gene.

Function 

This gene encodes a member of the GIT protein family. GIT proteins interact with G protein-coupled receptor kinases and possess ADP-ribosylation factor (ARF) GTPase-activating protein (GAP) activity. This gene undergoes extensive alternative splicing; although ten transcript variants have been described, the full length sequence has been determined for only four variants. The various isoforms have functional differences, with respect to ARF GAP activity and to G protein-coupled receptor kinase 2 binding.

Model organisms 
	

Model organisms have been used in the study of GIT2 function. A conditional knockout mouse line, called Git2Gt(XG510)Byg was generated as part of the International Knockout Mouse Consortium program — a high-throughput mutagenesis project to generate and distribute animal models of disease to interested scientists — at the Wellcome Trust Sanger Institute.

Male and female animals underwent a standardized phenotypic screen to determine the effects of deletion.  Mice lacking Git2 had no significant defects in viability or fertility, so further tests were carried out and four significant phenotypes were reported:

 Mutant mice had differences in their clinical blood chemistry compared to wildtype control mice.
 Mutant male mice had a decrease in white blood cell count.
 An increased thickness in hippocampus was observed.
 Mutant female mice were slower to respond to heat when placed on a hotplate.

Interactions 

GIT2 has been shown to interact with GIT1.

References

Further reading 

 
 
 
 
 
 
 
 
 
 
 
 
 
 
 

Genes mutated in mice